The Foot in Mouth Award is presented each year by the Plain English Campaign for "a baffling comment by a public figure". The award was first made in 1993, when it was given to Ted Dexter, the chairman of selectors for the England cricket team. It was awarded again the following year, and, after a two-year break, annually from 1997.

The Plain English Campaign was set up in 1979 when the founder, Chrissie Maher, shredded hundreds of jargon-filled forms and documents in Parliament Square, London. The group made their first awards the next year, rewarding those organisations that used plain English, and highlighting those that did not. Although the Foot in Mouth award was first made in 1993, a specific acknowledgment was made to a comment by Dan Quayle, Vice President of the United States in 1991.

The award has been presented 20 times, and only Rhodri Morgan and Boris Johnson have received it more than once. The Welsh politician won in both 1998 and 2005, and made a light-hearted response to his second win, claiming that the first award had "made [his] name." Politicians have been recipients of the award more times than any other group of people, collecting it on 14 occasions; people from the world of sport have won four times. The 43rd President of the United States, George W. Bush, received the award in 2008, with the subtitle "Lifetime Achievement Award", given not for a single quote, but for his continued "services to gobbledygook".

Winners

See also
 Golden Bull Award

References

External links
 

Ironic and humorous awards
British awards
1993 establishments in the United Kingdom
Awards established in 1993